Duncan McDougall Munro Clark (22 June 1915 – 8 July 2003) was an Olympic track and field athlete from Scotland. He was born in Greenock.

Clark specialised in hammer throw events during his career, representing Great Britain in two consecutive Olympic Games, starting in 1948. He claimed the gold medal for Scotland in the men's hammer throw event at the 1950 British Empire Games in Auckland, New Zealand.

References
 

1915 births
2003 deaths
Sportspeople from Greenock
Scottish male hammer throwers
British male hammer throwers
Olympic athletes of Great Britain
Athletes (track and field) at the 1948 Summer Olympics
Athletes (track and field) at the 1952 Summer Olympics
Commonwealth Games gold medallists for Scotland
Commonwealth Games medallists in athletics
Athletes (track and field) at the 1950 British Empire Games
European Athletics Championships medalists
Medallists at the 1950 British Empire Games